John F. Temple was an American college baseball coach, serving primarily as head coach of the Boston College Eagles baseball team from 1950–1957. Temple also served as the Boston College Eagles men's ice hockey team in 1942 and 1943.

Playing career
Temple played ice hockey and baseball at Cambridge Rindge and Latin School in Cambridge, Massachusetts. He played his freshman year at Boston College as a member of the hockey team, but the program was dropped before his sophomore season. He then played third base and outfield for the Boston College baseball team from 1929–1931. He then briefly played in the Northeastern League before retired to teach in the Cambridge school system.

Coaching career
In 1950, Temple was named the successor to Freddie Maguire who left to take a job with the Boston Red Sox. He coached the 1953 Eagles team to the 1953 College World Series, where they went 2–2 and finished 4th.

Head coaching record

References

External links
 Boston College Hall of Fame

Living people
Boston College Eagles men's ice hockey players
Boston College Eagles baseball players
Boston College Eagles men's ice hockey coaches
Boston College Eagles baseball coaches
Year of birth missing (living people)